Ronald Daniel Gómez Rodríguez (born 22 September 1998) is a Salvadoran professional footballer who plays as a center-back for Primera División club Águila and the El Salvador national team.

Club career
On January 19 2022, Rodriguez joined USL Championship club FC Tulsa. He was released by Tulsa following the 2022 season.

International career
He made his debut for El Salvador national football team on 5 June 2021 in a World Cup qualifier against U.S. Virgin Islands.

References

External links
 

1998 births
People from San Miguel, El Salvador
Living people
Salvadoran footballers
El Salvador under-20 international footballers
El Salvador international footballers
Association football defenders
C.D. Águila footballers
Salvadoran Primera División players
FC Tulsa players
Expatriate soccer players in the United States
Salvadoran expatriate footballers
Salvadoran expatriate sportspeople in the United States